Raul Vazquez may refer to:

 Raúl Marcelo Vázquez (born 1948), Cuban cyclist
 Raul Vazquez (physician) (born 1963), Puerto-Rican primary care physician and philanthropist